John William Dodson, 2nd Baron Monk Bretton, CB (22 September 1869 – 29 July 1933) was a British diplomat, sometime chairman of London County Council, and landowner.

The only son of the first Lord Monk Bretton, Dodson was educated at Eton (1883–1887), and New College, Oxford, (BA, 1891, 3rd class, Modern history). Was called to the Bar at the Inner Temple, June, 1891.

In 1894 he entered the Diplomatic Service. Appointed Honorary Attaché to the Legation at Tangier, December 28, 1896; and was for some time Honorary Attaché at Constantinople. Variously also appointed Honorary Attache to the Embassy at Paris, February 1, 1894. Transferred to Constantinople, October 1, 1895. He was an Honorary Attache in Paris (from 1 February 1894) and Constantinople (from 1 October 1895), where he made reports on the massacre of Armenian Christians at Constantinople, 1896, and returned to England after succeeding to the barony on 25 May 1897. He resigned on 1 October 1897.

From March 1899 to November 1900 he was assistant Private Secretary to the Secretary for Foreign Affairs, Lord Salisbury, and then 1900–1903 he was Principal Private Secretary to Secretary of State for the Colonies, Joseph Chamberlain. As such he accompanied Chamberlain on his visit to South Africa in 1902–03, following the end of the Second Boer War.

Between 1912 and 1914 he was Alderman of the London County Council (LCC); after the war he represented Clapham from 1922; he was chairman of the Parliamentary Committee (1925–1929); and he was chairman of the Council itself, 1929–1930. This was a suitable peak as Joe Chamberlain had once said of him: 'Monk Bretton knows more about local government than any other man of my acquaintance'.

The Times obituary described him:
'Throughout his life he showed an unflagging perseverance in every sphere to which he devoted himself, but he never allowed his industry to overwhelm him, as it does with some with his temperament'.

He was also a JP; Deputy Lieutenant (Sussex); in politics a Unionist; a subaltern in 1st Cinque Port Rifle Volunteers, and during the First World War he was a Major in the Sussex Yeomanry and was attached to the Naval Intelligence Department. He was a member of the Travellers' and Brooks's Clubs.

At Firle, on 19 August 1911, he married Ruth, daughter of the Hon. Charles Brand (4th son of Mr. Speaker Brand) of Little Dene, near Lewes, by Alice Emma Sturgis, daughter of Sylvain Van de Weyer.

In London he lived at 6 Seamore place, Mayfair (that whole street was demolished c. 1938), then at 16 Princes Gardens, Knightsbridge SW7, and finally at 11 Vale Avenue (The Vale), SW3.
He died aged 63 in a nursing home in Brighton on 29 July and was buried in the family vault at Barcombe in East Sussex, on 1 August 1933. He was succeeded by his only son, John Charles Dodson.

Some ancestors

References

 The Times, 31 July 1933.
 Gentleman's magazine, volume one, pages 129–132, February 1929, (on George Pearson).
 Foreign Office List & Diplomatic & Consular Hand Book, 1905.
 Dod's Parliamentary Companion for 1932, Dod, London, 1932.

1869 births
1933 deaths
Companions of the Order of the Bath
Alumni of New College, Oxford
People educated at Eton College
Members of HM Diplomatic Service
Barons in the Peerage of the United Kingdom
People from Barcombe
Members of London County Council
Sussex Yeomanry officers
Eldest sons of British hereditary barons
19th-century British diplomats